Champasak United Football Club (Laos ສະໂມສອນຈຳປາສັກຢູ່ໄນເຕັດ) is a professional football club, based in Pakse, Laos, that plays in the Lao Premier League, the highest division in Laotian football. The club plays its home matches at the Champasak Stadium, which holds 12,000 people.

In July 2015, the BBC that reported the club were employing illegally trafficked players as young as 14 years old from Western Africa, having forced them to sign contracts and make them live in sub-standard accommodation without pay.

References

Players

External links 
Official Facebook page

Football clubs in Laos
Association football clubs established in 2015
2015 establishments in Laos